Bayless is a surname. Notable people with the surname include:

 Becky Bayless (born 1982), American professional wrestler
 Betsey Bayless, American politician who was the Secretary of State of Arizona from 1997 to 2003
 Charles E. Bayless (born 1942), American university president
 Howard Bayless, American healthcare professional and politician
 Kenny Bayless, professional boxing referee
 Rick Bayless (born 1953), American chef, owner of Frontera Grill in Chicago and star of Mexico: One Plate at a Time
 Rick Bayless (American football) (born 1964), American football player
 Jerryd Bayless (born 1988), American basketball player
 Skip Bayless (born 1951), American television sports commentator for ESPN networks
 William F. Bayless (died 1873), American politician

Other uses
 Bayless Markets, a supermarket chain
 Bayless School District, a small public school district in urban St. Louis, Missouri, includes Bayless Senior High School
 US v. Bayless, 921 F. Supp. 211 (S.D.N.Y. 1996), controversial evidentiary ruling by Judge Harold Baer Jr.

See also
Baylis, a surname
Bayliss, a surname